Divine Mercy Sanctuary may refer to:
 Divine Mercy Sanctuary, Kraków, with the remains of saint Faustina Kowalska and the most popular Divine Mercy image by Adolf Hyła
 Sanctuary of the Divine Mercy, Vilnius, with the first Divine Mercy image by Eugeniusz Kazimirowski
 Divine Mercy Sanctuary (Płock), the place of the first apparition of the Jesus, I trust in You image
 Divine Mercy Sanctuary (Białystok), where blessed Michał Sopoćko is buried
 Głogowiec, Łęczyca County, where saint Faustina Kowalska was born, and nearby Świnice Warckie, where she was baptized
 Santo Spirito in Sassia, Rome
 National Shrine of The Divine Mercy (Stockbridge, Massachusetts)
 National Shrine of The Divine Mercy, Philippines
 Divine Mercy Shrine (Misamis Oriental), Philippines